The Ladies Man is a 1961 American comedy film directed by and starring Jerry Lewis. It was released on June 28, 1961 by Paramount Pictures.

Plot
Herbert H. Heebert is a young man who loses his girlfriend, swears off romance, and then takes a job at a genteel, women-only boarding house, run by Helen Wellenmellen.  Although most of the women treat him like a servant, Fay helps him with his fear of women.

Cast
 Jerry Lewis as Herbert H. Heebert/Marna Heebert
 Helen Traubel as Helen N. Wellenmellon
 Pat Stanley as Fay
 Kathleen Freeman as Katie
 George Raft as Himself
 Harry James as Harry
 Marty Ingels as Himself
 Buddy Lester as Willard C. Gainsborough
 Gloria Jean as Gloria
 Hope Holiday as Miss Anxious
 Mary LaRoche as Miss Society
 Madlyn Rhue as Miss Intellect
 Ann McCrea as Miss Sexy Pot
 Jacqueline Fontaine as Working Girl
In addition, Lillian Briggs, the "Queen of Rock & Roll," made her Hollywood acting debut in this film and actor George Raft appeared in a cameo role. Patty Thomas plays herself a dancer.

Production
Mel Brooks worked on the screenplay. He fought with Lewis and left the production. In Brooks's biography, he stated that the final draft screenplay only featured two of his scenes and asked the Writers Guild of America to make sure that he did not get given any credit. Filming started in November 1960. The main set is a four-story doll house-like interior of a mansion turned boarding house with a central courtyard allowing crane shots spanning its three and a half floors. The structure was several rooms deep at each level and in total 177 feet long, 154 wide and 36 feet high. The main set alone cost $500,000 to build (equivalent to $ in ). After two weeks of filming, Lewis fired cinematographer Haskell Boggs, who had worked with him on most of his films, over a disagreement and replaced him with W. Wallace Kelley.

The film features the real-life wedding of Daria Massey and David Lee Joesting.

Release
The film premiered in Brooklyn on June 28, 1961. In New York City, it opened on July 12 in a double-bill with Love in a Goldfish Bowl.

Reception
Howard Thompson, in a review for The New York Times wrote: "Now, in all fairness to a frankly light-headed vehicle that dies on its feet, Mr. Lewis' latest gets off to a fresh and really funny beginning." However, after the first half-hour, "the remainder of the picture, with everyone else firmly relegated to the background, has Mr. Lewis shuffling and stumbling in full view, as if he and the movie were merely improvising." Overall, it received mixed reviews in New York. Based on a limited selection of non-contemporary reviews, on Rotten Tomatoes, the film holds a 100% rating based on 10 reviews, with an average rating of 7.25/10.

The film grossed $271,635 in its first week of release in New York.

In 1998, Jonathan Rosenbaum of the Chicago Reader included the film in his unranked list of the best American films not included on the AFI Top 100.

Herbert H. Heebert's line "Hey, lady!" was nominated for the American Film Institute's 2005 list AFI's 100 Years...100 Movie Quotes.

Home media
The film was released on DVD on October 14, 2004 and again on July 15, 2014 in a 4-film collection, 4 Film Favorites: Jerry Lewis, with The Bellboy, The Errand Boy, and The Patsy.

References

External links 

 
 

1961 films
1961 comedy films
American comedy films
1960s English-language films
Films directed by Jerry Lewis
Paramount Pictures films
Films with screenplays by Jerry Lewis
Films with screenplays by Bill Richmond (writer)
Films produced by Jerry Lewis
Films scored by Walter Scharf
1960s American films